was the 4th daimyō of Odawara Domain in Sagami Province, (modern-day Kanagawa Prefecture) in mid-Edo period Japan. His courtesy title was Dewa no Kami.

Biography
Ōkubo Tadaoki was the eldest son of Ōkubo Tadamasa, the 3rd daimyō of Odawara, and was born at Odawara Castle. He became clan leader and daimyō of Odawara on the death of his father in 1732.  He held a number of minor ceremonial posts within the Tokugawa shogunate, but his tenure was noted for a steady deterioration in the state of the domain's finances, which were still suffering from the after effects of the Great Genroku earthquake and the Hōei eruption of Mount Fuji. Tadaoki implemented various austerity measures, cumulating in the restructuring of 80 percent of the domain's retainers due to a state of near bankruptcy.  He retired from public life in 1763 with these issues unresolved, and died of illness on November 2, 1764, at the domain's Edo residence, His grave is at the clan temple of Saisho-ji in Setagaya, Tokyo.

Takaoki was married to a daughter of Yanagisawa Yoshisato, daimyō of Yamato-Kōriyama Domain in Yamato Province.

References 
 Papinot, Edmond. (1906) Dictionnaire d'histoire et de géographie du japon. Tokyo: Librarie Sansaisha...Click link for digitized 1906 Nobiliaire du japon (2003)
 The content of much of this article was derived from that of the corresponding article on Japanese Wikipedia.

Fudai daimyo
Tadaoki
1715 births
1764 deaths